Tournaments included international (FIBA), professional (club) and amateur and collegiate levels.

International tournaments

National senior team tournaments

3X3 championships

Other international championships

FIBA youth championships

Professional club seasons

FIBA Intercontinental Cup

Continental seasons

Men

Women

Regional seasons

Men

Women

Domestic league seasons

Men

Women

College seasons

Men's

Women's

Deaths
January 1 — Larry Weinberg, 92, American NBA owner (Portland Trail Blazers).
January 3 — Bob Burrow, 84, American college All-American (Kentucky) and NBA player (Minneapolis Lakers, Rochester Royals).
January 6 — Ben Coleman, 57, American NBA player (New Jersey Nets, Philadelphia 76ers, Milwaukee Bucks).
January 11 — Gus Ganakas, 92, American college coach (Michigan State).
January 11 — Jumping Johnny Wilson, 91, American player (Harlem Globetrotters).
January 19 — Ken Warzynski, 70, American college player (DePaul).
January 20 — Jimmy Rayl, 77, American college All-American (Indiana) and ABA player (Indiana Pacers).
January 26 — Dale Barnstable, 93, two-time college national champion at Kentucky (1948, 1949).
February 3 — Irv Brown, 83, college basketball referee and announcer.
February 14 — Clinton Wheeler, 59, American NBA player (Indiana Pacers, Miami Heat, Portland Trail Blazers).
February 20 — Joe Gibbon, 83, All-American college player (Ole Miss).
February 23 — Carl Meinhold, 92, American BAA player (Baltimore Bullets, Providence Steamrollers, Chicago Stags).
February 28 — Jim Fritsche, 87, American NBA player (Minneapolis Lakers, Baltimore Bullets, Fort Wayne Pistons).
March 9 — Alberto Bucci, 70, Italian coach (Fortitudo Bologna, Virtus Bologna, Scaligera Verona)
March 10 — Alekos Spanoudakis, 90, Greek player (Olympiacos).
March 12 — Tom Meyer, 96, American NBL player (Detroit Gems, Detroit Vagabonds).
March 19 — Thanasis Giannakopoulos, 88, Greek executive (Panathinaikos B.C.).
March 23 — Jacques Dessemme, 93, French Olympic player (1952).
March 25 — Paul Dawkins, 61, American-Turkish player (Utah Jazz, Galatasaray).
March 25 — Cal Ramsey, 81, American NBA player (St. Louis Hawks, New York Knicks, Syracuse Nationals).
April 4 — Myer Skoog, 92, American NBA player (Minneapolis Lakers).
April 14 — John MacLeod, 81, American college (Oklahoma, Notre Dame) and NBA (Phoenix Suns) coach.
April 18 — Ken Buehler, 99, American NBL player (Sheboygan Red Skins, Fort Wayne Zollner Pistons).
April 22 — Andy O'Donnell, 94, American NBA player (Baltimore Bullets).
April 23 — Johnny Neumann, 68, American ABA (Memphis Tams, Virginia Squires) and NBA (Los Angeles Lakers) player.
April 24 — Zoran Marojević, Serbian Olympic silver medalist (1968).
April 25 — John Havlicek, 79, American Hall of Fame NBA player (Boston Celtics)
May 3 — George Hanna, 90, Iraqi Olympic player (1948).
May 3 — Andy Jick, 66, American public address announcer (Boston Celtics, Boston College).
May 4 — Jumpin Jackie Jackson, 79, American player (Harlem Globetrotters).
May 7 — Arnaldo Taurisano, 85, Italian coach (Cantù, Partenope Napoli, Brescia).
May 15 — Rob Babcock, 66, American NBA executive (Minnesota Timberwolves, Toronto Raptors).
May 22 — Tony Gennari, 76, Italian player (Varese, Libertas Forlì, Milano 1958).
May 23 — Wilfredo Peláez, 88, Uruguayan Olympic bronze medalist (1952).
May 25 — Rod Bramblett, 53, American college announcer (Auburn).
June 4 — Billy Gabor, 97, American NBA player (Syracuse Nationals).
June 11 — Yvan Delsarte, 90, Belgian Olympic player (1952).
June 13 — Jiří Pospíšil, 68, Czech Olympic player (1972, 1976, 1980).
June 16 — Kelly Coleman, 80, American player (Harlem Globetrotters, Chicago Majors, Baltimore Bullets).
June 23 — Žarko Varajić, 67, Serbian Olympic silver medalist (1976).
June 25 — Tony Barone, 72, American college (Creighton, Texas A&M) and NBA (Memphis Grizzlies) coach.
June 27 — Vukica Mitić, 65, Serbian Olympic Bronze medalist (1980).
June 28 — Borislav Džaković, 71, Serbian-Bosnian coach (KK Crvena zvezda, KK Partizan).
July 5 — Lewis Lloyd, 60, American NBA player (Golden State Warriors, Houston Rockets, Philadelphia 76ers).
July 6 — Charles Hardnett, 80, American NBA player (Baltimore Bullets).
July 22 — Nikos Milas, 91, Greek player (Panathinaikos), coach (Panathinaikos, AEK Athens) and Olympian (1952).
July 22 — Wayne See, 95, American NBA player (Waterloo Hawks).
July 24 — Cathy Inglese, 60, American college coach (Vermont, Boston College, Rhode Island)
July 28 — Howard Nathan, American NBA player (Atlanta Hawks).
July 28 — Harrison Wilson Jr., 94, American college coach (Jackson State).
July 29 — Max Falkenstien, 95, American college radio broadcaster (Kansas).
August 10 — Cándido Sibilio, 60, Spanish player (FC Barcelona, Tau Vitoria) and Olympian (1980).
August 12 — Jim Marsh, 73, American NBA player (Portland Trail Blazers) and broadcaster (Seattle SuperSonics).
August 13 — Vladimír Ptáček, 64, Czech Olympic player (1976).
August 16 — Penka Stoyanova, 69, Bulgarian Olympic silver (1980) and bronze (1976) medalist.
August 19 — Mike Leaf, 58, American college coach (Winona State).
August 20 — Kelsey Weems, 51, American player (Quad City Thunder, Hartford Hellcats, Yakima SunKings).
August 22 — Tom Nissalke, 87, American NBA (Houston Rockets, Utah Jazz) and ABA (San Antonio Spurs) coach.
August 25 — Jerry Rook, 75, American ABA player (New Orleans Buccaneers).
September 2 — Rainer Pethran, 68, German Olympic player (1972).
September 5 — Bob Rule, 75, American NBA player (Seattle SuperSonics, Philadelphia 76ers, Cleveland Cavaliers, Milwaukee Bucks).
September 9 — Fred McLeod, 67, American NBA television and radio broadcaster (Detroit Pistons, Cleveland Cavaliers).
September 22 — Courtney Cox Cole, 48, American college player (Indiana).
September 22 — Andre Emmett, 37, American NBA player (Memphis Grizzlies, New Jersey Nets).
September 22 — Nat Frazier, 84, American college (Morgan State, Bowie State) and WBL (Washington Metros) coach.
September 23 — Gordon C. Stauffer, 89, American college coach (Washburn, Indiana State, Nicholls).
September 24 — Mel Utley, 66, American college player (St. John's)
September 27 — Gene Melchiorre, 92, American college All-American (Bradley).
September 28 — Bill Ridley, 91, All-American college player (Illinois).
September 29 — Glen Smith, 90, All-American college player (Utah).
October 7 — Ed Kalafat, 86, American NBA player (Minneapolis Lakers).
October 16 — Ed Beck, 83, American college national champion at Kentucky (1958).
October 28 — Al Bianchi, 87, American NBA player (Syracuse Nationals) and coach (Seattle SuperSonics).
October 28 — Ron Dunlap, 72, American player (Maccabi Tel Aviv).
October 29 — Claude Constantino, 80, Senegalese Olympic player (1968).
October 30 — Paul Crosby, 30, American college (Mississippi Valley State) player.
November 2 — Bohumil Tomášek, 83, Czech Olympic player (1960).
November 4 — Eli Pasquale, 59, Canadian Olympic player (1984, 1988).
November 7 — Frank Saul, 95, American NBA player (Rochester Royals, Baltimore Bullets, Minneapolis Lakers).
November 14 — Anthony Grundy, 40, American NBA player (Atlanta Hawks).
November 14 — Charles Moir, 88, American college coach (Roanoke, Tulane, Virginia Tech).
November 15 — Irv Noren, 94, American NBL player (Chicago American Gears).
November 18 — Doug Smart, 82, All-American college player (Washington).
November 19 — Bob Hallberg, 75, American college coach (Saint Xavier, Chicago State, UIC).
November 20 — Wataru Misaka, 95, American NBA player (New York Knicks), national college champion at Utah (1944).
December 5 — Ji Zhe, 33, Chinese player (Liaoning Flying Leopards, Beijing Ducks).
December 13 — Carl Scheer, 82, American ABA, NBA (Charlotte Hornets, Denver Nuggets, Los Angeles Clippers) and CBA executive.
December 13 — Linda Jónsdóttir, 63, Icelandic Úrvalsdeild kvenna (KR) and Icelandic national team player.
December 20 — Rick Fisher, 71, American ABA player (Utah Stars, The Floridians)
December 29 — LaDell Andersen, 90, American college (Utah State, BYU) and ABA (Utah Stars) coach.

See also
 Timeline of women's basketball

References

 
2019 sport-related lists